Elizabeth, Lady Berkeley (née Carey; later Chamberlain; 24 May 1576 – 23 April 1635), was an English courtier and patron of the arts.

Life
Elizabeth Carey was the only child of George Carey, 2nd Baron Hunsdon, and Elizabeth Spencer. Queen Elizabeth I was one of her godmothers. Her childhood was divided between the Hunsdon residence at Blackfriars, London, Carisbrooke Castle on the Isle of Wight, and (from 1593) the manor of West Drayton, Middlesex.

She married Sir Thomas Berkeley on 19 February 1596, probably at Blackfriars, when she was nineteen years old. Her family were patrons of Shakespeare's theatre company, and her wedding has been put forward as one of the possible occasions when A Midsummer Night's Dream was performed for the first time in public. On 5 January 1606, at the wedding festivities of the Earl of Essex and Lady Frances Howard, Elizabeth was one of the female dancers representing the "Powers of Juno" in Ben Jonson's masque Hymenaei: there is an extant portrait of her dressed in her masque costume.

She bore her husband a daughter and a son:
 Theophila Berkeley (1596–1643), who married Sir Robert Coke. Theophila was educated "under the sole direction of her mother", and was later said to be fluent in French, Italian, Latin and Greek. Theophila was a companion of the king's daughter  Elizabeth, when she lived at Coombe Abbey, and was a bridesmaid at her wedding to Frederick V of the Palatinate.
 George Berkeley, 8th Baron Berkeley (7 October 1601 – 10 August 1658), who was tutored by Philemon Holland of Coventry. George married Elizabeth Stanhope, the daughter of Sir Michael Stanhope, by whom he had issue.

Elizabeth and her husband circulated between Berkeley residences including New Park, Gloucestershire, Claverdon, Warwickshire (owned by her maternal family), and Caludon Castle, near Coventry (the last being the principal home of her father-in-law, Henry, 7th Baron Berkeley, until his death in 1613). However, Sir Thomas was financially imprudent and ran up enormous debts. In a crisis of 1606–7, Elizabeth took over the management of his affairs (selling her own inheritance at Tonbridge and Hadlow, Kent, to minimise the burden); and in 1609 Sir Thomas signed a contract handing over all responsibility for household management to Elizabeth and the Berkeley family steward, John Smyth of Nibley. When Sir Thomas died (aged 37) in 1611, she paid off the many outstanding debts. 

In 1618 she bought the estate of Cranford, Middlesex for the sum of £7,000 from the co-heirs of Sir Richard Aston. She also acquired the manor of Durdans, near Epsom, Surrey, which was settled on her daughter Theophila. In February 1622, she remarried Sir Thomas Chamberlain (or Chamberland), a Justice of the King's Bench. When he died on 17 September 1625, her second husband bequeathed a generous £10,000 to her son from her first marriage.

Elizabeth died on 23 April 1635 and was buried on 25 April in Cranford parish church. Her white marble effigy, depicting her in her shroud, is by Nicholas Stone.

Learning and patronage
Carey's mother was educated and a noted patron of the arts, and passed these traits on to her daughter. Carey was tutored by Henry Stanford. In 1594, aged 18, she is known to have translated two of Petrarch's sonnets from Italian into English. In the same year, Thomas Nashe dedicated The Terrors of the Night to her, praising her "sharpe Wit" and "religious piety". (The previous year, Nashe had dedicated Christ's Teares Over Jerusalem to her mother.) Peter Erondelle's French primer and book of manners, The French Garden (1605), was also dedicated to her, and it has been suggested that she served as the model for the character of "Lady Rimellaine" in the book. In 1610, she was patron of Philemon Holland's translation from the Latin of William Camden's Britannia. She appears to have considered contributing £20, and perhaps £40, towards the volume; and in a commendatory poem Thomas Muriell praised her as the "rare Phoenix cause of this translation". However, shortly before publication, she seems to have become unsatisfied with the quality of Holland's work and withdrew her support: the published book does not mention her patronage, although she is mentioned in the next edition of 1637. She is also listed among the many dedicatees of Camden's Annales (1625). 

She donated volumes in Latin, Greek, French, Italian and English to Coventry school and city library. In later life, John Smyth described her living at Cranford, "amongst her thousands of books".

References

Bibliography
 [on her mother, but includes a paragraph on Lady Berkeley]

1576 births
1635 deaths
16th-century  English women
17th-century English nobility
17th-century English women
Elizabeth
Elizabeth
Daughters of barons
Wives of knights
Patrons of literature